The Chebyshev polynomials are two sequences of polynomials related to the cosine and sine functions, notated as  and . They can be defined in several equivalent ways, one of which starts with trigonometric functions:

The Chebyshev polynomials of the first kind  are defined by
 

Similarly, the Chebyshev polynomials of the second kind  are defined by
 

 

The Chebyshev polynomials  are polynomials with the largest possible leading coefficient whose absolute value on the interval  is bounded by 1. They are also the "extremal" polynomials for many other properties.

The resulting interpolation polynomial minimizes the problem of Runge's phenomenon and provides an approximation that is close to the best polynomial approximation to a continuous function under the maximum norm, also called the "minimax" criterion. This approximation leads directly to the method of Clenshaw–Curtis quadrature.

These polynomials were named after Pafnuty Chebyshev.

Definitions

Recurrence definition 
The Chebyshev polynomials of the first kind are obtained from the recurrence relation

The recurrence also allows to represent them explicitly as the determinant of a tridiagonal matrix of size :

 

There are several other generating functions for the Chebyshev polynomials; the exponential generating function is

The generating function relevant for 2-dimensional potential theory and multipole expansion is

The Chebyshev polynomials of the second kind are defined by the recurrence relation

Notice that the two sets of recurrence relations are identical, except for  vs. 

and the exponential generating function is

Trigonometric definition
As described in the introduction, the Chebyshev polynomials of the first kind can be defined as the unique polynomials satisfying

or, in other words, as the unique polynomials satisfying

The polynomials of the second kind satisfy:

or

which is structurally quite similar to the Dirichlet kernel :

(The Dirichlet kernel, in fact, coincides with what is now known as the Chebyshev polynomial of the fourth kind.)

That  is an th-degree polynomial in  can be seen by observing that  is the real part of one side of de Moivre's formula.

The identity is quite useful in conjunction with the recursive generating formula, inasmuch as it enables one to calculate the cosine of any integer multiple of an angle solely in terms of the cosine of the base angle.

Chebyshev polynomials of the first kind can be computed directly from the Euler's identity

Expanding the latter, one gets

which in turn means that

Alternatively, the first two Chebyshev polynomials of the first kind are computed directly from the definition to be

and

while the rest may be evaluated using a specialization of the product-to-sum identity

as, for example,

Conversely, an arbitrary integer power of trigonometric functions may be expressed as a linear combination of trigonometric functions using Chebyshev polynomials
 

An immediate corollary is the expression of complex exponentiation in terms of Chebyshev polynomials: given ,

Commuting polynomials definition

Chebyshev polynomials can also be characterized by the following theorem:

 for all .

Pell equation definition
The Chebyshev polynomials can also be defined as the solutions to the Pell equation

in a ring . Thus, they can be generated by the standard technique for Pell equations of taking powers of a fundamental solution:

Relations between the two kinds of Chebyshev polynomials
 
It follows that they also satisfy a pair of mutual recurrence equations:

The second of these may be rearranged using the recurrence definition for the Chebyshev polynomials of the second kind to give

Using this formula iteratively gives the sum formula

while replacing  and  using the derivative formula for  gives the recurrence relationship for the derivative of :

This relationship is used in the Chebyshev spectral method of solving differential equations.

Turán's inequalities for the Chebyshev polynomials are

The integral relations are

where integrals are considered as principal value.

Explicit expressions
Different approaches to defining Chebyshev polynomials lead to different explicit expressions such as:

with inverse

where the prime at the summation symbol indicates that the contribution of  needs to be halved if it appears.

where  is a hypergeometric function.

Properties

Symmetry

Roots and extrema
A Chebyshev polynomial of either kind with degree  has  different simple roots, called Chebyshev roots, in the interval . The roots of the Chebyshev polynomial of the first kind are sometimes called Chebyshev nodes because they are used as nodes in polynomial interpolation. Using the trigonometric definition and the fact that

One unique property of the Chebyshev polynomials of the first kind is that on the interval  all of the extrema have values that are either −1 or 1. Thus these polynomials have only two finite critical values, the defining property of Shabat polynomials. Both the first and second kinds of Chebyshev polynomial have extrema at the endpoints, given by:

Specifically, when  is even, 

When  is odd, 

Differentiation and integration
The derivatives of the polynomials can be less than straightforward. By differentiating the polynomials in their trigonometric forms, it can be shown that:

It can be shown that:

More general formula states:

which is of great use in the numerical solution of eigenvalue problems.

Also, we have

Concerning integration, the first derivative of the  implies that

and the recurrence relation for the first kind polynomials involving derivatives establishes that for 

Furthermore, we have

Products of Chebyshev polynomials
The Chebyshev polynomials of the first kind satisfy the relation

which is easily proved from the product-to-sum formula for the cosine,

For  this results in the already known recurrence formula, just arranged differently, and with  it forms the recurrence relation for all even or all odd indexed Chebyshev polynomials (depending on the parity of the lowest ) which implies the evenness or oddness of these polynomials. Three more useful formulas for evaluating Chebyshev polynomials can be concluded from this product expansion:

The polynomials of the second kind satisfy the similar relation

(with the definition  by convention ).
They also satisfy

For  this recurrence reduces to

which establishes the evenness or oddness of the even or odd indexed Chebyshev polynomials of the second kind depending on whether  starts with 2 or 3.

Composition and divisibility properties

For  the order of composition may be reversed, making the family of polynomial functions  a commutative semigroup under composition.

Since  is divisible by  if  is odd, it follows that  is divisible by  if  is odd.

Orthogonality
Both  and  form a sequence of orthogonal polynomials. The polynomials of the first kind  are orthogonal with respect to the weight

on the interval , i.e. we have:

This can be proven by letting  and using the defining identity .

Similarly, the polynomials of the second kind  are orthogonal with respect to the weight

on the interval , i.e. we have:

(The measure  is, to within a normalizing constant, the Wigner semicircle distribution.)

These orthogonality properties follow from the fact that the Chebyshev polynomials solve the Chebyshev differential equations
 
 
which are Sturm–Liouville differential equations. It is a general feature of such differential equations that there is a distinguished orthonormal set of solutions. (Another way to define the Chebyshev polynomials is as the solutions to those equations.)

The  also satisfy a discrete orthogonality condition:

For the polynomials of the second kind and any integer  with the same Chebyshev nodes , there are similar sums:

and without the weight function:

For any integer , based on the  zeros of :

one can get the sum:

and again without the weight function:

Minimal -norm
For any given , among the polynomials of degree  with leading coefficient 1 (monic polynomials),

is the one of which the maximal absolute value on the interval [−1, 1] is minimal.

This maximal absolute value is

and  reaches this maximum exactly  times at

Remark
By the equioscillation theorem, among all the polynomials of degree , the polynomial  minimizes  on  if and only if there are  points  such that .

Of course, the null polynomial on the interval  can be approximated by itself and minimizes the -norm.

Above, however,  reaches its maximum only  times because we are searching for the best polynomial of degree  (therefore the theorem evoked previously cannot be used).

Chebyshev polynomials as special cases of more general polynomial families
The Chebyshev polynomials are a special case of the ultraspherical or Gegenbauer polynomials , which themselves are a special case of the Jacobi polynomials :

Chebyshev polynomials are also a special case of Dickson polynomials:
 

Other properties

Similar to the formula

we have the analogous formula

For ,

and

Examples

First kind

The first few Chebyshev polynomials of the first kind are

Second kind

The first few Chebyshev polynomials of the second kind are

As a basis set

Furthermore, as mentioned previously, the Chebyshev polynomials form an orthogonal basis which (among other things) implies that the coefficients  can be determined easily through the application of an inner product. This sum is called a Chebyshev series or a Chebyshev expansion.

Since a Chebyshev series is related to a Fourier cosine series through a change of variables, all of the theorems, identities, etc. that apply to Fourier series have a Chebyshev counterpart. These attributes include:

 The Chebyshev polynomials form a complete orthogonal system.
 The Chebyshev series converges to  if the function is piecewise smooth and continuous.
 At a discontinuity, the series will converge to the average of the right and left limits.

The abundance of the theorems and identities inherited from Fourier series make the Chebyshev polynomials important tools in numeric analysis; for example they are the most popular general purpose basis functions used in the spectral method, often in favor of trigonometric series due to generally faster convergence for continuous functions (Gibbs' phenomenon is still a problem).

Example 1
One can express

One can find the coefficients  either through the application of an inner product or by the discrete orthogonality condition. For the inner product,

which gives

Alternatively, when the inner product of the function being approximated cannot be evaluated, the discrete orthogonality condition gives an often useful result for approximate coefficients,

The rate of convergence depends on the function and its smoothness.

This allows us to compute the approximate coefficients  very efficiently through the discrete cosine transform

Example 2
To provide another example:

Partial sums
The partial sums of

are very useful in the approximation of various functions and in the solution of differential equations (see spectral method). Two common methods for determining the coefficients  are through the use of the inner product as in Galerkin's method and through the use of collocation which is related to interpolation.

As an interpolant, the  coefficients of the st partial sum are usually obtained on the Chebyshev–Gauss–Lobatto points (or Lobatto grid), which results in minimum error and avoids Runge's phenomenon associated with a uniform grid. This collection of points corresponds to the extrema of the highest order polynomial in the sum, plus the endpoints and is given by:

Polynomial in Chebyshev form
An arbitrary polynomial of degree  can be written in terms of the Chebyshev polynomials of the first kind. Such a polynomial  is of the form

 

Polynomials in Chebyshev form can be evaluated using the Clenshaw algorithm.

Families of polynomials related to Chebyshev polynomials
Polynomials denoted  and  closely related to Chebyshev polynomials are sometimes used. They are defined by

and satisfy

A. F. Horadam called the polynomials  Vieta–Lucas polynomials and denoted them . He called the polynomials  Vieta–Fibonacci polynomials and denoted them . Lists of both sets of polynomials are given in Viète's Opera Mathematica, Chapter IX, Theorems VI and VII.

Shifted Chebyshev polynomials of the first and second kinds are related to the Chebyshev polynomials by

When the argument of the Chebyshev polynomial satisfies  the argument of the shifted Chebyshev polynomial satisfies . Similarly, one can define shifted polynomials for generic intervals .

Around 1990 the terms "third-kind" and "fourth-kind" came into use in connection with Chebyshev polynomials, although the polynomials denoted by these terms had an earlier development under the name airfoil polynomials. According to J. C. Mason and G. H. Elliott, the terminology "third-kind" and "fourth-kind" is due to Walter Gautschi, "in consultation with colleagues in the field of orthogonal polynomials." The Chebyshev polynomials of the third kind are defined as

and the Chebyshev polynomials of the fourth kind are defined as

where .

and are proportional to Jacobi polynomials  with

See also
Chebyshev filter
Chebyshev cube root
Dickson polynomials
Legendre polynomials
Hermite polynomials
Minimal polynomial of 2cos(2pi/n)
Romanovski polynomials
Chebyshev rational functions
Approximation theory
The Chebfun system
Discrete Chebyshev transform
Markov brothers' inequality
Clenshaw algorithm

References

Sources

External links

 
 
  – includes illustrative Java applet.
 
 
 

Special hypergeometric functions
Orthogonal polynomials
Polynomials
Approximation theory